Edwin Ruud (9 June 1854 – 9 December 1932) was a Norwegian-American mechanical engineer and inventor who immigrated to the United States where he designed, sold, and popularized the tankless water heater. He was the founder and President of Ruud Manufacturing Company, now a division of Rheem Manufacturing Company.

Biography

Early life
Edwin Ruud was born in the parish of Askim in  Østfold, Norway. He was educated in engineering at the  Horten Technical School (Horten tekniske skole)  in Vestfold, Norway.

The Fuel Gas And Manufacturing Company
In the 1880s, Ruud began working for George Westinghouse at the Fuel Gas and Manufacturing Company in Pittsburgh, Pennsylvania. Eight years after filing his first US patent, Ruud filed the first of five patents he would assign to Westinghouse's Fuel Gas and Manufacturing company.

In 1889, Ruud engineered a design for an automatic storage tank-type gas water heater that used a bottom gas heater and temperature controlled gas-valve. He later patented the design in 1890. In October 1890, he expanded on his first water heater design, under the Fuel Gas and Manufacturing Company.

Ruud Manufacturing Company
On January 22, 1897, Ruud filed a patent separate from the Fuel Gas and Manufacturing Company for an Automatic Water Heater. His new design consisted of a cast iron shell, enclosing burners, heating surfaces (a coil of copper tubing through which water flows), and thermostat controlling gas-valves.  The object of the design improvement was, "to maintain the supply of water at the desired temperature at all times."

With this new design, Ruud left the Fuel Gas and Manufacturing Company to start Ruud Manufacturing, his own engineering and manufacturing shop where he began to manufacture and popularize in home, as well as commercial and industrial water heaters.
Ruud was issued his patent for the coiled tube Automatic Water Heater on September 6, 1898.

Ruud's business expanded as he popularized and improved on his instant water heater design. In 1908, Ruud Manufacturing acquired two local heating and plumbing firms. James Hay of the James Hay Company, heating and plumbing engineers, closed his business in order to operate as president of the Ruud Manufacturing Company in 1908. and J.H. Folsom of Folsom-Webster Co., heating and plumbing contracting firm, dissolved his partnership in Folsom-Webster Company in 1908 to serve as chief of the Cincinnati branch of the Ruud Manufacturing Company. By 1915, the Ruud Manufacturing Company had offices in Pittsburgh, Pennsylvania; Kalamazoo, Michigan; Toronto, Canada; and Hamburg, Germany.

The Ruud Instantaneous Automatic Water Heater

The Thermal Valve Model, Type F, of the Ruud Instantaneous Automatic Water Heater is a design that allows the user to instantaneously heat water for on demand applications while not heating, thus saving fuel, when not in use. The Type F was able to use LP gas, natural gas, and gasoline, requiring only a change of burner spud orifices, and was manufactured in two variations, the "Standard Pressure Heaters," designed to operate in conditions where pressure was at least twenty-five pounds per square inch (1.7 bar), and "Low Pressure Heaters," where operational water pressure could be as low as four pounds per square inch (0.3 bar). Thermal Valve Model, Type F heaters were manufactured in four residential sizes reflective of their output in gallons per minute: 3, 4, 6, 8.
In 1915, there were approximately one-hundred-thousand of the Type F installed throughout The United States and Canada.

Ruud Heating and Air Conditioning Equipment
Edwin Ruud died in 1932 and his widow, Minna Kaufmann Ruud died in 1953. In 1959, the water heater arm of the Ruud Manufacturing Company was purchased by Rheem Manufacturing Company  and continued operation as a division of Rheem.

Awards
1904 - Louisiana Purchase Exposition (St. Louis World’s Fair) Gold Medal for his automatic water heater
1905- Franklin Institute presented him with the Edward Longstreth Medal of Merit for the Ruud Instantaneous Automatic Water Heater.
1927 - Honorary doctorate at University of Pittsburgh
1929 - Appointed Knight of the Order of St Olav

Patents
Balanced Slid-Valve: July 4, 1882 - US260612
Stuffing Box: August 5, 1890 - US433824
Water Heater: December 30, 1890 - US443797
Fluid Meter: May 5, 1891 - US451881
Water Heater: September 29, 1891 - US460513
Automatic Steam Regulator for Gas Producers: September 6, 1892 - US482320
Automatic Water-Heater: September 6, 1898 - US610281
Automatic Cut-off For Gas-Service Pipes: September 10, 1901 - US682345
Storage Water-Heater: May 14, 1907 - US853738
Thermostatic-Valve-Operating Mechanism: December 31, 1907 - US875217
Automatic Temperature Control for Self-heating Flat Irons: September 30, 1913 - US1074467
Water Valve for Instantaneous Water Heaters: February 26, 1918 - US1257932
Fluid-Mixing Apparatus: April 6, 1920 - USRE14836

References

External links
Ruud official website
Edwin Ruud Care Center (Edwin Ruuds Omsorgssenter)

1854 births
1932 deaths
People from Østfold
Norwegian emigrants to the United States
19th-century American inventors
20th-century American inventors
American industrialists
American company founders
American industrial engineers
American business executives
Recipients of the St. Olav's Medal
Burials at Homewood Cemetery